František Vláčil (19 February 1924, Český Těšín – 27 January 1999, Prague) was a Czech film director, painter, and graphic artist.

Between 1945 and 1950, he studied aesthetics and art history at Masaryk University in Brno. Later he worked in various groups and ateliers (e.g. on animated films), but his main area became played film. His films are well known for extraordinarily high art quality. Vláčil was awarded many film prizes like the Prize of the International Film Festival 1998 in Karlovy Vary or the Czech Lion Prize for his longstanding contribution to world film culture. In 1998 Vláčil was voted the greatest Czech director of all time by a poll of Czech film critics. His film Marketa Lazarová is considered by some critics to be the best Czech film ever made.

Biography

Early life
He spent childhood in north Moravia. He shortly studied Academy of Arts, Architecture and Design in Prague but switched to the faculty of Arts at Masaryk University. He finished his studies in 1951. He was interested in filmmaking during his studies and worked as a screenwriter in Brno Cartoon and puppet film studio. He later went to newly formed Studio of Popular Scientific and Educational Films. He made 4 short documentary films in the studio.

Military film
Vláčil worked in a studio of Czechoslovak military film during his compulsory military service. He was in the military from 1951 to 1958. He met with cinematographer Jan Čuřík with whom he frequently collaborated during his career. He also met another director Karel Kachyňa. Vláčil's short films made in the military studio were mostly instructory and propagandist. His first film was a 1953 short Vzpomínka that commemorated deceased communist president Klement Gottwald. Another of his film shorts is a documentary Posádka na štítě that is about meteorologists working on Lomnický štít. The film shows contrast between a man and mountains. Vláčil also participated in the filmmaking of other directors. In 1955, Vláčil participated as an adviser in the making of the war film, Tank Brigade, coordinating battle scenes. His last military short was an instructory and motivational film Sebeobrana. He also made a short film Clouds of Glass which is considered his finest creation while in the army. It is the only film that Vláčil made in the military and was not determined by politics or genre. Clouds of Glass won an award at the Documentary and Short Film Festival in Venice. Vláčil left the army in 1958.

Barrandov
Vláčil was employed at Barrandov Studios. He debuted with a short film "The Chase" (segment of No Entrance). The film is about two members of the border-guard who chase an enemy agent. The film not a regular story about the border-guard but features a strong focus on the beauties of nature. He made his first full-length film The White Dove in 1960. The film received positive reviews and some awards. He made a historical film The Devil's Trap that was also a success. His next film was a historical drama Marketa Lazarová. He worked six years on the film. He collaborated with significant designers of costumes and decorations, Theodor Pištěk, Jan Koblasa and others. The film was highly acclaimed and was voted the all-time best Czech movie in a prestigious 1998 poll of Czech film critics and publicists. The film was also very expensive and Vláčil was forced to make The Valley of the Bees, another historical film. The Valley of the Bees used the same decorations so the expenditures of Markéta Lazarová could partially be repaid. The film starred Petr Čepek. Vláčil then worked with Čepek on his next film Adelheid.

During the Normalization era, Vláčil was not allowed to make feature films and had to leave Barrandov Studio.  He made some shorts films such as Art Nouveau's Prague. He was allowed to make another full-length film in 1976, it was a drama Smoke on the Potato Fields. His next film, thriller Shadows of a Hot Summer, won a Crystal Globe.

Vláčil started to work with screenwriter Zdeněk Mahler and together they worked on some films. They made a biographical film Concert at the End of Summer. It was followed by other significant films Snake's Venom, Shades of Fern and Magician. These were his last films before he retired.

After Velvet Revolution, Vláčil received a number of awards. He won Czech Lion for Lifetime Work and Extraordinary Contribution to Czech Cinema and became the President of Czech Film and Television Academy. In 1997, Vláčil broke his left leg and was hospitalized. He was operated on but his operation was unsuccessful and had to be re-operated. The second operation was successful and he was allowed to leave hospital. He was only one day home when he fell into unconsciousness due to heart arrhythmia. He never recovered and died on 27 January 1999.

Problems with alcohol
When Vláčil started to make his own projects in the 1960s, he started heavily drinking. He believed that alcohol helped him in his work, helping him to reach his visions. His problems with alcohol worsened after he made Markéta Lazarová. After he finished the film, he looked "like a living skeleton". When he finished Adelheid, he collapsed. He underwent therapy and made Smoke on the Potato Field during a period of sobriety. Owing to the omission of his favourite scene from the film, because it was destroyed, Vláčil starts drinking again. His alcoholism was not helping his work anymore. He tried to fight his alcoholism by making Snake's Venom. Vláčil's alcoholism led him to lose his family and friends.

Filmography

Short films

As actor

Accolades

References

External links
 
 František Vláčil at Kinoblog (web archive)
 "Out of the past: Frantisek Vlácil" at Sight & Sound (web archive)
 New book of Petr Gajdošík: František Vláčil. Život a dílo /František Vláčil. Life and Work/ (Camera obscura, 2018) 875 pages
 New book of Petr Gajdošík: František Vláčil. Život a dílo /František Vláčil. Life and Work/ Web Kosmas

 
1924 births
1999 deaths
People from Český Těšín
Czech film directors
Czechoslovak film directors
Czech graphic designers
Masaryk University alumni